A lawn is an area of soil-covered land planted with grasses and other durable plants such as clover which are maintained at a short height with a lawnmower (or sometimes grazing animals) and used for aesthetic and recreational purposes—it is also commonly referred to as part of a garden. Lawns are usually composed only of grass species, subject to weed and pest control, maintained in a green color (e.g., by watering), and are regularly mowed to ensure an acceptable length. Lawns are used around houses, apartments, commercial buildings and offices. Many city parks also have large lawn areas. In recreational contexts, the specialised names turf, pitch, field or green may be used, depending on the sport and the continent.

The term "lawn", referring to a managed grass space, dates to at least than the 16th century. With suburban expansion, the lawn has become culturally ingrained in some areas of the world as part of the desired household aesthetic. However, awareness of the negative environmental impact of this ideal is growing. In some jurisdictions where there are water shortages, local government authorities are encouraging alternatives to lawns to reduce water use. Researchers in the United States have noted that suburban lawns are "biological deserts" that are contributing to a "continental-scale ecological homogenization." Lawn maintenance practices also cause biodiversity loss in surrounding areas.

Etymology
Lawn is a cognate of Welsh llan which is derived from the Common Brittonic word landa that originally meant
heath, barren land, or clearing.

History

Origins

Lawns may have originated as grassed enclosures within early medieval settlements used for communal grazing of livestock, as distinct from fields reserved for agriculture. The word "laune" is first attested in 1540 from the Old French lande "heath, moor, barren land; clearing".

Lawns became popular with the aristocracy in northern Europe from the Middle Ages onward. In medieval Europe, open expanses of low grasses became valued among the aristocracy because they allowed those inside an enclosed fence or castle to view those approaching. The early lawns were not always distinguishable from pasture fields. The damp climate of maritime Western Europe in the north made lawns possible to grow and manage. They were not a part of gardens in other regions and cultures of the world until contemporary influence.

The origins of the popularity of contemporary lawns comes from 18th-century trends replicating the romantic aestheticism of grassy pastoralism from Italian landscape paintings.

Before the invention of mowing machines in 1830, lawns were managed very differently. They were an element of wealthy estates and manor houses, and in some places were maintained by the labor-intensive methods of scything and shearing. In most situations, they were also pasture land maintained through grazing by sheep or other livestock. Areas of grass grazed regularly by rabbits, horses or sheep over a long period often form a very low, tight sward similar to a modern lawn. This was the original meaning of the word "lawn" care, and the term can still be found in place names. Some forest areas where extensive grazing is practiced still have these seminatural lawns. For example, in the New Forest, England, such grazed areas are common, and are known as lawns, for example Balmer Lawn.

The English lawn

It was not until the 17th and 18th century that the garden and the lawn became a place created first as walkways and social areas. They were made up of meadow plants, such as camomile, a particular favourite. In the early 17th century, the Jacobean epoch of gardening began; during this period, the closely cut "English" lawn was born. By the end of this period, the English lawn was a symbol of status of the aristocracy and gentry; it showed that the owner could afford to keep land that was not being used for a building, or for food production.

In the early 18th century, landscape gardening for the aristocracy entered a golden age, under the direction of William Kent and Lancelot "Capability" Brown. They refined the English landscape garden style with the design of natural, or "romantic", estate settings for wealthy Englishmen. Brown, remembered as "England's greatest gardener", designed over 170 parks, many of which still endure. His influence was so great that the contributions to the English garden made by his predecessors Charles Bridgeman and William Kent are often overlooked.

His work still endures at Croome Court (where he also designed the house), Blenheim Palace, Warwick Castle, Harewood House, Bowood House, Milton Abbey (and nearby Milton Abbas village), in traces at Kew Gardens and many other locations. His style of smooth undulating lawns which ran seamlessly to the house and meadow, clumps, belts and scattering of trees and his serpentine lakes formed by invisibly damming small rivers, were a new style within the English landscape, a "gardenless" form of landscape gardening, which swept away almost all the remnants of previous formally patterned styles. His landscapes were fundamentally different from what they replaced, the well-known formal gardens of England which were criticised by Alexander Pope and others from the 1710s.

The open "English style" of parkland first spread across Britain and Ireland, and then across Europe, such as the garden à la française being replaced by the French landscape garden. By this time, the word "lawn" in England had semantically shifted to describe a piece of a garden covered with grass and closely mown. Wealthy families in America during the late 18th century also began mimicking English landscaping styles. In 1780, the Shaker community began the first industrial production of high-quality grass seed in North America, and a number of seed companies and nurseries were founded in Philadelphia. The increased availability of these grasses meant they were in plentiful supply for parks and residential areas, not just livestock.

Thomas Jefferson has long been given credit for being the first person to attempt an English-style lawn at his estate, Monticello, in 1806, but many others had tried to emulate English landscaping before he did. Over time, an increasing number towns in New England began to emphasize grass spaces. Many scholars link this development to the romantic and transcendentalist movements of the 19th century. These green commons were also heavily associated with the success of the Revolutionary War and often became the homes of patriotic war memorials after the Civil War ended in 1865.

Middle class pursuit

Before the mechanical lawnmower, the upkeep of lawns was possible only for the extremely wealthy estates and manor houses of the aristocracy. Labor-intensive methods of scything and shearing the grass were required to maintain the lawn in its correct state, and most of the land in England was required for more functional, agricultural purposes.

This all changed with the invention of the lawnmower by Edwin Beard Budding in 1830.
Budding had the idea for a lawnmower after seeing a machine in a local cloth mill which used a cutting cylinder (or bladed reel) mounted on a bench to trim the irregular nap from the surface of woolen cloth and give a smooth finish. Budding realised that a similar device could be used to cut grass if the mechanism was mounted in a wheeled frame to make the blades rotate close to the lawn's surface. His mower design was to be used primarily to cut the lawn on sports grounds and extensive gardens, as a superior alternative to the scythe, and he was granted a British patent on 31 August 1830.

Budding went into partnership with a local engineer, John Ferrabee, who paid the costs of development and acquired rights to manufacture and sell lawn mowers and to license other manufacturers. Together they made mowers in a factory at Thrupp near Stroud. Among the other companies manufacturing under license the most successful was Ransomes, Sims & Jefferies of Ipswich which began mower production as early as 1832.

However, his model had two crucial drawbacks. It was immensely heavy (it was made of cast iron) and difficult to manoeuvre in the garden, and did not cut the grass very well. The blade would often spin above the grass uselessly. It took ten more years and further innovations, including the advent of the Bessemer process for the production of the much lighter alloy steel and advances in motorization such as the drive chain, for the lawnmower to become a practical proposition. Middle-class families across the country, in imitation of aristocratic landscape gardens, began to grow finely trimmed lawns in their back gardens.

In the 1850s, Thomas Green of Leeds introduced a revolutionary mower design called the Silens Messor (meaning silent cutter), which used a chain to transmit power from the rear roller to the cutting cylinder. The machine was much lighter and quieter than the gear driven machines that preceded them, and won first prize at the first lawn mower trial at the London Horticultural Gardens. Thus began a great expansion in the lawn mower production in the 1860s. James Sumner of Lancashire patented the first steam-powered lawn mower in 1893. Around 1900, Ransomes' Automaton, available in chain- or gear-driven models, dominated the British market. In 1902, Ransomes produced the first commercially available mower powered by an internal combustion gasoline engine. JP Engineering of Leicester, founded after World War I, invented the first riding mowers.

This went hand-in-hand with a booming consumer market for lawns from the 1860s onward. With the increasing popularity of sports in the mid-Victorian period, the lawn mower was used to craft modern-style sporting ovals, playing fields, pitches and grass courts for the nascent sports of football, lawn bowls, lawn tennis and others. The rise of Suburbanisation in the interwar period was heavily influenced by the garden city movement of Ebenezer Howard and the creation of the first garden suburbs at the turn of the 20th century. The garden suburb, developed through the efforts of social reformer Henrietta Barnett and her husband, exemplified the incorporation of the well manicured lawn into suburban life. Suburbs dramatically increased in size. Harrow Weald went from just 1,500 to over 10,000 while Pinner jumped from 3,00 to over 20,000. During the 1930s, over 4 million new suburban houses were built and the 'suburban revolution' had made England the most heavily suburbanized country in the world by a considerable margin.

Lawns began to proliferate in America from the 1870s onwards. As more plants were introduced from Europe, lawns became smaller as they were filled with flower beds, perennials, sculptures, and water features. Eventually the wealthy began to move away from the cities into new suburban communities. In 1856, an architectural book was published to accompany the development of the new suburbia that placed importance on the availability of a grassy space for children to play on and a space to grow fruits and vegetables that further imbued the lawn with cultural importance. Lawns began making more appearances in development plans, magazine articles, and catalogs. The lawn became less associated with being a status symbol, instead giving way to a landscape aesthetic. Improvements in the lawn mower and water supply enabled the spread of lawn culture from the Northeast to the South where the grass grew more poorly. This in combination with setback rules which required all homes to have a 30-foot gap between the structure and the sidewalk meant that the lawn had found a specific place in suburbia.

The chemical boom
After World War II, a surplus of synthetic nitrogen in the United States led to chemical firms such as DuPont seeking to expand the market for fertilizers. The suburban lawn offered an opportunity to market fertilizers, previously only used by farmers, to homeowners. In 1955, DuPont released Uramite, a slow-release nitrogen fertilizer specifically marketed for lawns. The trend continued throughout the 1960s, with chemical firms such as DuPont and Monsanto utilizing television advertising and other forms of advertisement to market pesticides, fertilizers, and herbicides. The environmental impacts of this widespread chemical use were noticed as early as the 1960s, but suburban lawns as a source of pollution were largely ignored.

Organic lawns 
Due to the harmful effects of excessive pesticide use, fertilizer use, climate change and pollution, a movement developed in the late 20th century to require organic lawn management. By the first decade of the 21st century, American homeowners were using ten times more pesticides per acre than farmers, poisoning an estimated 60 to 70 million birds yearly. Lawn mowers are a significant contributor to pollution released into Earth's atmosphere, with a riding lawn mower producing the same amount of pollution in one hour of use as 34 cars. In recent years, some municipalities have banned synthetic pesticides and fertilizers and required organic land care techniques be used. There are many locations with organic lawns that require organic landscaping. In the 2020s, lawn alternatives and more eco-friendly lawn management began increasing greatly in popularity, with the help of social media.

United States

Prior to European colonization, the grasses on the East Coast of North America were mostly broom straw, wild rye, and marsh grass. As Europeans moved into the region, it was noted by colonists in New England, more than others, that the grasses of the New World were inferior to those of England and that their livestock seemed to receive less nutrition from it. In fact, once livestock brought overseas from Europe spread throughout the colonies, much of the native grasses of New England disappeared, and an inventory list from the 17th century noted supplies of clover and grass seed from England. New colonists were even urged by their country and companies to bring grass seed with them to North America. By the late 17th century, a new market in imported grass seed had begun in New England.

Much of the new grasses brought by Europeans spread quickly and effectively, often ahead of the colonists. One such species, Bermuda grass (Cynodon dactylon), became the most important pasture grass for the southern colonies.

Kentucky bluegrass (Poa pratensis) is a grass native to Europe or the Middle East. It was likely carried to Midwestern United States in the early 1600s by French missionaries and spread via the waterways to the region around Kentucky. However, it may also have spread across the Appalachian Mountains after an introduction on the east coast. 

Farmers at first continued to harvest meadows and marshes composed of indigenous grasses until they became overgrazed. These areas quickly fell to erosion and were overrun with less favorable plant life. Soon, farmers began to purposefully plant new species of grass in these areas, hoping to improve the quality and quantity of hay to provide for their livestock as native species had a lower nutritive value. While Middle Eastern and Europeans species of grass did extremely well on the East Coast of North America, it was a number of grasses from the Mediterranean that dominated the Western seaboard. As cultivated grasses became valued for their nutritional benefits to livestock, farmers relied less and less on natural meadows in the more colonized areas of the country. Eventually even the grasses of the Great Plains were overrun with European species that were more durable to the grazing patterns of imported livestock.
A pivotal factor in the spread of the lawn in America was the passage of legislation in 1938 of the 40-hour work week. Until then, Americans had typically worked half days on Saturdays, leaving little time to focus on their lawns. With this legislation and the housing boom following the Second World War, managed grass spaces became more commonplace. The creation in the early 20th century of country clubs and golf courses completed the rise of lawn culture.

According to study based on satellite observations by Cristina Milesi, NASA Earth System Science, its estimates: "More surface area in the United States is devoted to lawns than to individual irrigated crops such as corn or wheat.... area, covering about 128,000 square kilometers in all."

Lawn monoculture was a reflection of more than an interest in offsetting depreciation, it propagated the homogeneity of the suburb itself. Although lawns had been a recognizable feature in English residences since the 19th century, a revolution in industrialization and monoculture of the lawn since the Second World War fundamentally changed the ecology of the lawn. Money and ideas flowed back from Europe after the U.S. entered WWI, changing the way Americans interacted with themselves and nature, and the industrialization of war hastened the industrialization of pest control. Intensive suburbanization both concentrated and expanded the spread of lawn maintenance which meant increased inputs in not only petrochemicals, fertilizers, and pesticides, but also natural resources like water. Lawns became a means of performing class values for the urban middle class, in which the condition of the lawn becomes representative of moral character and social reliability. The social values associated with lawns are promoted and upheld by social pressure, laws, and chemical producers. Social pressure comes from neighbors or homeowner associations who think that the unkempt lawns of neighbors may affect their own property values or create eyesores. Pressures to maintain a lawn are also legal; there are often local or state laws against letting weeds get too tall or letting a lawn space be especially unkempt, punishable by fees or litigation. Chemical producers unwilling to lose business propagate the ideal of a lawn, making it seem unattainable without chemical aid.

Front lawns became standardized in the 1930s when, over time, specific aspects such as grass type and maintenance methods became popular. The lawn-care industry boomed, but the Great Depression of the 1930s and in the period prior to World War II made it difficult to maintain the cultural standards that had become heavily associated with the lawn due to grass seed shortages in Europe, America's main supplier. Still, seed distributors such as Scotts Miracle-Gro Company in the United States encouraged families to continue to maintain their lawns, promoting it as a stress-relieving hobby. During the war itself, homeowners were asked to maintain the appearances of the home front, likely as a show of strength, morale, and solidarity. After World War II, the lawn aesthetic once again became a standard feature of North America, bouncing back from its minor decline in the decades before with a vengeance, particularly as a result of the housing and population boom post-war.

The VA loan in the United States let American ex-servicemen buy homes without providing a down payment, while the Federal Housing Administration offered lender inducements that aided the reduction of down payments for the average American from 30% to as little as 10%. These developments made owning your own home cheaper than renting, further enabling the spread of suburbia and its lawns.

Levittown, New York, was the beginning of the industrial suburb in the 20th century, and by proxy the industrial lawn. Between 1947 and 1951, Abraham Levitt and his sons built more than seventeen thousand homes, each with its own lawn. Abraham Levitt wrote "No single feature of a suburban residential community contributes as much to the charm and beauty of the individual home and the locality as well-kept lawns". Landscaping was one of the most important factors in Levittown's success - and no feature was more prominent than the lawn. The Levitts understood that landscaping could add to the appeal of their developments and claimed that, "increase in values are most often found in neighborhoods where lawns show as green carpets" and that, over the years, "lawns trees and shrubs become more valuable both aesthetically and monetarily". During 1948, the first spring that Levittown had enjoyed, Levitt and Sons fertilized and reseeded all of the lawns free of charge.

The economic recession that began in 2008 has resulted in many communities worldwide to dig up their lawns and plant fruit and vegetable gardens. This has the potential to greatly change cultural values attached to the lawn, as they are increasingly viewed as environmentally and economically unviable in the modern context.

Australia
The appearance of the lawn in Australia followed closely after its establishment in North America and parts of Europe. Lawn was established on the so-called "nature strip" (a uniquely Australian term) by the 1920s and was common throughout the developing suburbs of Australia. By the 1950s, the Australian-designed Victa lawn mower was being used by the many people who had turned pastures into lawn and was also being exported to dozens of countries. Prior to the 1970s, all brush and native species were stripped from a development site and replaced with lawns that utilized imported plant species. Since the 1970s there has been an interest in using indigenous species for lawns, especially considering their lower water requirements. Lawns are also established in garden areas as well as used for the surface of sporting fields.

Over time, with consideration to the frequency of droughts in Australia, the movement towards "naturalism", or the use of indigenous plant species in yards, was beneficial. These grasses were more drought resistant than their European counterparts, and many who wished to keep their lawns switched to these alternatives or allowed their green carpets to revert to the indigenous scrub in an effort to reduce the strain on water supplies. However, lawns remain a popular surface and their practical and aesthetically pleasing appearance reduces the use of water-impervious surfaces such as concrete. The growing use of rainwater storage tanks has improved the ability to maintain them.

Following recent droughts, Australia has seen a change to predominately warm-season turfgrasses, particularly in the southern states like New South Wales and Victoria which are predominately temperate climates within urban regions. The more drought tolerant grasses have been chosen by councils and homeowners for the choice of using less water compared to cool-season turfgrasses like fescue and ryegrass. Mild dormancy seems to be of little concern when high-profile areas can be oversown for short periods or nowadays, turf colourants (fake green) are extremely popular.

Uses

Lawns are a common feature of private gardens, public landscapes and parks in many parts of the world. They are created for aesthetic pleasure, as well as for sports or other outdoor recreational use. Lawns are useful as a playing surface both because they mitigate erosion and dust generated by intensive foot traffic and because they provide a cushion for players in sports such as rugby, football, soccer, cricket, baseball, golf, tennis, field hockey, and lawn bocce.

Lawns and the resulting lawn clipping waste can be used as an ingredient in making compost and is also viewed as fodder, used in the production of lawn clipping silage which is fed to livestock as a sustainable feed source.

Types of lawn plants
Lawns need not be, and have not always been, made up of grasses alone. Other plants for lawn-like usable garden areas are sedges, low herbs and wildflowers, moss lawns, and ground covers that can be walked upon.

Thousands of varieties of grasses and grasslike plants are used for lawns, each adapted to specific conditions of precipitation and irrigation, seasonal temperatures, and sun/shade tolerances. Plant hybridizers and botanists are constantly creating and finding improved varieties of the basic species and new ones, often more economical and environmentally sustainable by needing less water, fertilizer, pest and disease treatments, and maintenance. The three basic categories are cool season grasses, warm season grasses, and grass alternatives.

Grasses

Many different species of grass are currently used, depending on the intended use and the climate. Coarse grasses are used where active sports are played, and finer grasses are used for ornamental lawns for their visual effects. Some grasses are adapted to oceanic climates with cooler summers, and others to tropical and continental climates with hotter summers. Often, a mixture of grass or low plant types is used to form a stronger lawn when one type does better in the warmer seasons and the other in the colder ones. This mixing is taken further by a form of grass breeding which produces what are known as cultivars. A cultivar is a cross-breed of two different varieties of grass and aims to combine certain traits taken from each individual breed. This creates a new strain which can be very specialised, suited to a particular environment, such as low water, low light or low nutrient.

Cool season grasses
They retain their color well in extreme cold and typically grow very dense, carpetlike lawns with relatively little thatch.

Bluegrass (Poa spp.)
Bentgrass (Agrostis spp.)
Ryegrasses (Lolium spp.)
Fescues (Festuca spp.)
Feather reed grass (Calamagrostis spp.)
Tufted hair grass (Deschampsia spp.)

Warm season grasses
They often go dormant in cooler months, turning shades of tan or brown. Many warm season grasses are quite drought tolerant, and can handle very high summer temperatures, although temperatures below  can kill most southern ecotype warm season grasses.

Zoysiagrass (Zoysia spp.)
Bermudagrass (Cynodon spp.)
St. Augustine grass (Stenotaphrum secundatum)
Bahiagrass (Paspalum spp.)
Centipedegrass (Eremochloa ophiuroides)
Carpet grass (Axonopus spp.)
Buffalograss (Bouteloua dactyloides)
Grama grass (Bouteloua spp.)
Kikuyu grass (Pennisetum clandestinum)

Grass alternatives
Carex species and cultivars are well represented in the horticulture industry as 'sedge' alternatives for 'grass' in mowed lawns and garden meadows. Both low-growing and spreading ornamental cultivars and native species are used in for sustainable landscaping as low-maintenance and drought-tolerant grass replacements for lawns and garden meadows. wildland habitat restoration projects and natural landscaping and gardens use them also for 'user-friendly' areas. The J. Paul Getty Museum has used Carex pansa (meadow sedge) and Carex praegracilis (dune sedge) expansively in the Sculpture Gardens in Los Angeles.

Some lower sedges used are:
Carex caryophyllea (cultivar 'The Beatles')
C. divulsa (Berkeley sedge)
C. glauca (blue sedge) (syn. C. flacca)
C. pansa (meadow sedge)
C. praegracilis (dune sedge)
C. subfusca (mountain sedge)
C. tumulicola (foothill sedge) (cultivar 'Santa Cruz Mnts. selection')
C. uncifolia (ruby sedge)

Grass seed for shade 
Grass seed mixes have been developed to include only grass seed species that grow will in low sunlight conditions. These seed mixes is designed to deal with light shade caused by trees that can create patchiness, or slightly heavier shade that prevents the full growth of grass. Most lawns will experience shade in some shape or form due to surrounding fences, furniture, trees or hedges and these grass seed species' are especially useful in the Northern Hemisphere and Northwestern Europe.

 Festuca rubra subsp. commutata (Chewings Fescue)
 Poa pratensis (Smooth Stalked Meadow Grass)
 Festuca ovina (Sheeps Fescue)
 Festuca trachyphylla (hard fescue)
 Festuca rubra (Strong Creeping Red Fescue)

Ground cover alternatives

Some lawns are replaced with low ground covers, such as creeping thyme, camomile, Lippia, purple flowering Mazus, grey Dymondia, creeping sedums, and creeping jenny.
An example of this is the floral lawn in Avondale Park. Other alternatives to lawns include meadows, drought-tolerant xeriscape gardens, natural landscapes, native plant habitat gardens, paved Spanish courtyard and patio gardens, butterfly gardens, rain gardens, tapestry lawn and kitchen gardens. Trees and shrubs in close proximity to lawns provide habitat for birds in traditional, cottage and wildlife gardens. In shaded areas, moss can be an ideal alternative to a traditional grass lawn.

Lawn care and maintenance
Seasonal lawn establishment and care varies depending on the climate zone and type of lawn grown.

Planting and seeding

Early autumn, spring, and early summer are the primary seasons to seed, lay sod (turf), plant 'liners', or 'sprig' new lawns, when the soil is warmer and air cooler. Seeding is the least expensive, but may take longer for the lawn to be established. Aerating just before planting/seeding may promote deeper root growth and thicker turf.

Sodding (American English), or turfing (British English), provides an almost instant lawn, and can be undertaken in most temperate climates in any season, but is more expensive and more vulnerable to drought until established. Hydroseeding is a quick, less expensive method of planting large, sloped or hillside landscapes. Some grasses and sedges are available and planted from 'liner' and  containers, from 'flats', 'plugs' or 'sprigs', and are planted apart to grow together.

https://www.rhs.org.uk/lawns/autumn-care

Fertilizers and chemicals

Various organic and inorganic or synthetic fertilizers are available, with instant or time-release applications. Pesticides, which includes biological and chemical herbicides, insecticides and fungicides, treating diseases like gray leaf spot, are available. Consideration for their effects on the lawn and garden ecosystem and via runoff and dispersion on the surrounding environment, inform laws constraining their use. For example, the Canadian province of Quebec and over 130 municipalities prohibit the use of synthetic lawn pesticides. The Ontario provincial government promised on 24–2 September 2007 to also implement a province-wide ban on the cosmetic use of lawn pesticides, for protecting the public. Medical and environmental groups support such a ban. On 22 April 2008, the Provincial Government of Ontario announced that it will pass legislation that will prohibit, province-wide, the cosmetic use and sale of lawn and garden pesticides. The Ontario legislation would also echo Massachusetts law requiring pesticide manufacturers to reduce the toxins they use in production. Experts advise that a healthy lawn contains at least some "weeds" and insects, discouraging indiscriminate use of potentially harmful chemicals.

Sustainable gardening uses organic horticulture methods, such as organic fertilizers, biological pest control, beneficial insects, and companion planting, among other methods, to sustain an attractive lawn in a safe garden. An example of an organic herbicide is corn gluten meal, which releases an 'organic dipeptide' into the soil to inhibit root formation of germinating weed seeds. An example of an organic alternative to insecticide use is applying beneficial nematodes to combat soil-dwelling grubs, such as the larvae of chafer beetles. The Integrated Pest Management approach is a coordinated low impact approach.

Mowing and other maintenance practices

Maintaining a rough lawn requires only occasional cutting with a suitable machine, or grazing by animals. Maintaining a smooth and closely cut lawn, be it for aesthetic or practical reasons or because social pressure from neighbors and local municipal ordinances requires it, necessitates more organized and regular treatments. Usually once a week is adequate for maintaining a lawn in most climates. However, in the hot and rainy seasons of regions contained in hardiness zones greater than 8, lawns may need to be maintained up to two times a week.

Social impacts
The prevalence of the lawns in films such as Pleasantville (1998) and Edward Scissorhands (1990) alludes to the importance of the lawn as a social mechanism that gives great importance to visual representation of the American suburb as well as its practised culture. It is implied that a neighbor whose lawn is not in pristine condition is morally corrupt, emphasizing the role a well-kept lawn plays in neighborly and community relationships. In both of these films, green space surrounding a house in the suburbs becomes an indicator of moral integrity as well as of social and gender norms - lawn care has long been associated with men. These lawns also reinforce class and societal norms by subtly excluding those who may not have been able to afford a house with a lawn. The lawn as a reflection of someone's character and the neighborhood at large is not restricted to films; the same theme appears in The Great Gatsby (1925), by American novelist F. Scott Fitzgerald. Character Nick Carraway rents the house next to Gatsby's and fails to maintain his lawn according to West Egg standards. The rift between the two lawns troubles Gatsby to the point that he dispatches his gardener to mow Nick's grass and thereby establish uniformity.

Most lawn-care equipment over the decades has been advertised to men, and companies have long associated good lawn-care with good citizenship in their marketing campaigns. As well, the appearance of a healthy lawn was meant to imply the health of the man taking care of it; controlled weeds and strict boundaries became a practical application of the desire to control nature, as well as an expression of control over personal lives once working full-time became central to suburban success. Women were encultured over time to view the lawn as part of the household, as an essential furnishing, and to encourage their husbands to maintain a lawn for the family and community reputation.

During World War II (1939-1945), women became the focus of lawn-care companies in the absence of their husbands and sons. These companies promoted lawn care as a necessary means by which women could help support their male family-members and American patriotism as a whole. The image of the lawn changed from focusing on technology and manhood to emphasizing aesthetic pleasure and the health benefits derived from its maintenance; advertisers at lawn care companies assumed that women would not respond positively to images of efficiency and power. The language of these marketing campaigns still intended to imbue the female population with notions of family, motherhood, and the duties of a wife; it has been argued that this was done so that it would be easier for men returning from war to resume the roles which their wives had taken over in their absence. This was especially apparent in the 1950s and 1960s, when lawn-care rhetoric emphasized the lawn as a husband's responsibility and as a pleasurable hobby when he retired.

There are differences in the particulars of lawn maintenance and appearance, such as the length of the grass, species (and therefore its color), and mowing.

Environmental concerns

Greater amounts of chemical fertilizer and pesticides are used per surface area of lawn than on an equivalent surface of cultivated farmland, and the continued use of these products has been associated with environmental pollution, disturbance in the lawn ecosystem, and increased health risks to the local human and wildlife population. It has also been estimated that more herbicides are applied per surface of lawn than are used by most farmers to grow crops.

In response to environmental concerns, organic landscaping and organic lawn management systems have been developed and are mandated in some municipalities and properties. In the United Kingdom, the environmental group Plantlife has encouraged gardeners to refrain from mowing in the month of May to encourage plant diversity and provide nectar for insects.

Other concerns, criticisms, and ordinances regarding lawns arise from wider environmental consequences:
 Lawns can reduce biodiversity, especially when the lawn covers a large area. Traditional lawns often replace plant species that feed pollinators, requiring bees and butterflies to cross "wastelands" to reach food and host plants. Lawns promote homogenization and are normally cleared of unwanted plant and animal species, typically with synthetic pesticides, which can also kill unintended target species. They may be composed of introduced species not native to the area, particularly in the United States. This can produce a habitat that supports a reduced number of wildlife species. 
 Lawn maintenance commonly involves use of fertilizers and synthetic pesticides, which can cause great harm. Some are carcinogens and endocrine disruptors. They may permanently linger in the environment and negatively affect the health of potentially all nearby organisms. There are indications of an emerging regulatory response to this issue. For example, Sweden, Denmark, Norway, Kuwait, and Belize have placed restrictions on the use of the herbicide 2,4-D.

The use of pesticides and fertilizers, requiring fossil fuels for manufacturing, distribution, and application, has been shown to contribute to global warming. (Sustainable organic techniques have been shown to help reduce global warming.) A hectare of lawn in Nashville, Tennessee, produces greenhouse gases equivalent to 697 to 2,443 kg of carbon dioxide a year. The higher figure is equivalent to a flight more than halfway around the world. Lawn mowing is one element of lawn culture that causes a great amount of emissions.

Water conservation
Maintaining a green lawn sometimes requires large amounts of water. While natural rainfall is usually sufficient to maintain a lawn's health in the temperate British Isles- the birthplace of the concept of the lawn- in times of drought hosepipe bans may be implemented by the water suppliers. Conversely, exportation of the lawn ideal to more arid regions (e.g. U.S. Southwest and Australia) strains water supply systems when water supplies are already scarce. This necessitates upgrades to larger, more environmentally invasive equipment to deal with increased demand due to lawn watering. Grass typically goes dormant during periods of cold or heat outside of its preferred temperature ranges; dormancy reduces the grasses' water demand. Most grasses typically recover quite well from a drought, but many property owners become concerned about the brown appearance and increase watering during the summer months. Water in Australia observed 1995 data that up to 90% of the water used in Canberra during summer drought periods was used for watering lawns.

In the United States, 50 to 70% of residential water is used for landscaping, with most used to water lawns. A 2005 NASA study estimated conservatively  of irrigated lawn in the US, three times the area of irrigated corn.

Chemicals
An increased concern from the general public over pesticide and fertilizer use and their associated health risks, combined with the implementation of the legislation, such as the US Food Quality Protection Act, has resulted in the reduced presence of synthetic chemicals, namely pesticides, in urban landscapes such as lawns in the late 20th century. Many of these concerns over the safety and environmental impact of some of the synthetic fertilizers and pesticides has led to their ban by the United States Environmental Protection Agency and many local governments. The use of pesticides and other chemicals to care for lawns has also led to the death of nearly 7 million birds each year, a topic that was central to the novel Silent Spring by the conservationist Rachel Carson.

The use of lawn chemicals made its first appearance in the 18th century through the introduction of “English garden” fads. These types of lawns put precise hedging, clean cut grass, and extravagant plants on display. Following the initial introduction of lawn chemicals, they have still been continually used throughout North America. Because many of the turf-grass species in North America are not native to our ecosystems, they require extensive maintenance. According to the United States Geological Survey, 99% of the urban water samples that were tested contained one or more types of pesticides. In addition to water contamination, chemicals are making their way into houses which can lead to chronic exposure. Currently, standards for pesticide management practices have been put in place through the Food Quality Protection Act.

Decreasing environmental impact

In the United States, lawn heights are generally maintained by gasoline-powered lawnmowers, which contribute to urban smog during the summer months. The EPA found, in some urban areas, up to 5% of smog was due to small gasoline engines made before 1997, such as are typically used on lawnmowers. Since 1997, the EPA has mandated emissions controls on newer engines in an effort to reduce smog.

A 2010 study seemed to show lawn care inputs were balanced by the carbon sequestration benefits of lawns, and they may not be contributors to anthropogenic global warming.  Lawns with high maintenance (mowing, irrigation, and leaf blowing) and high fertilization rates have a net emission of carbon dioxide and nitrous oxide that have large global warming potential. Lawns that are fertilized, irrigated, and mowed weekly have a lower species diversity.

Replacing turf grass with low-maintenance groundcovers or employing a variety of low-maintenance perennials, trees and shrubs can be a good alternative to traditional lawn spaces, especially in hard-to-grow or hard-to-mow areas, as it can reduce maintenance requirements, associated pollution and offers higher aesthetic and wildlife value.

Non-productive space 
Lawns take up space that could otherwise be used more productively, such as for urban agriculture or home gardening. This is the case in many cities and suburbs in the United States, where open or unused spaces are "not generally a result of a positive decision to leave room for some use, but rather is an expression of a pastoral aesthetic norm that prizes spacious lawns and the zoning restrictions and neighborhood covenants that give these norms the force of law."

In urban and suburban spaces, growing food in front yards and parking strips can not only provide fresh produce but also be a source of neighborhood pride. While converting lawn space into strictly utilitarian farms is not common, incorporating edible plants into front yards with sustainable and aesthetically pleasing design is of growing interest in the United States.

No Mow May 
No Mow May is a campaign to encourage homeowners to not mow their lawns during the month of May to support pollinators and wildlife diversity. It was started by Plantlife, a wildlife conservation group in the United Kingdom, in 2019.

See also

Bacterial lawn
Moss lawn
Tapestry lawn
Organic lawn management
Gardening
List of organic gardening and farming topics

References

Further reading
Bormann, F. Herbert, et al. (1993) Redesigning the American Lawn.
Hessayon, D. G. (1997). The Lawn Expert. Expert. .
Huxley, A., ed. (1992). New RHS Dictionary of Gardening. Lawns: Ch. 3: pp. 26–33. Macmillan. .
Jenkins, V. S. (1994). The Lawn: A History of an American Obsession. Smithsonian Books. .
Steinberg, T. (2006). American Green, The Obsessive Quest for the Perfect Lawn. W.W. Norton & Co. .
Wasowski, Sally and Andy (2004). Requiem for a Lawnmower.

External links

 "Planting and care of Lawns" from the UNT Govt. Documents Dept.
 Integrated Pest Management Program: website & search-engine
 Lawn Care University at Michigan State University
 "EPA Management of Polluted Runoff: Nonpoint Source Pollution" (includes mismanagement of lawns problems.)

 
Garden features
Grasslands
Groundcovers
Hydrology and urban planning